The Canada men's national handball team is controlled by the Canadian Team Handball Federation. The Canadian Men's Team has historically consisted mainly of players from Alberta and Quebec, but has featured players from Manitoba, Saskatchewan and Ontario.

The team participated in the 2005 World Men's Handball Championship as well as the 2011 Men's Junior World Handball Championship

Tournament record

Summer Olympics
1976 – 11th

World Championship
1967 – 16th
1978 – 15th
2005 – 23rd

Pan American Games
2015 – 7th

Pan American Championship
1980 –  2nd
1983 –  3rd
1985 – 6th
1989 – 4th
1996 – 5th
1998 – 6th
2004 –  3rd
2008 – 7th
2010 – 7th
2016 – 10th
2018 – 5th

Nor.Ca. Championship
2018 –  2nd

Current squad

References

External links
IHF profile

Men's national handball teams
Handball in Canada
Handball